Estel Robirds (born October 15, 1934) is an American politician who served in the Missouri House of Representatives from the 143rd district from 1993 to 2003.

References

1934 births
Living people
Republican Party members of the Missouri House of Representatives
People from Ozark County, Missouri